Arius jella, the blackfin sea catfish, is a species of ocean catfish in the Siluriformes order.

It is native to the Indian Ocean, including in the seas off India.

References

jella
Catfish of Asia
Fish of the Indian Ocean
Fish of India
Taxa named by Francis Day
Fish described in 1877